Iron Lung Corp were an American electro-industrial group based in Chicago and originally formed by Jamie Duffy, Alex Eller, Gregory A. Lopez, Brian McGarvey, Daniel Neet, Will Nivens, Ethan Novak and Jason Novak. They released three full length albums: Big Shiny Spears (1997), Ditch the Attitude, Pally (2002), Body Snatchers (2013).

History
Iron Lung Corp was formed in 1996 by members of Chicago's Acumen Nation and Albany's The Clay People. The band's had been collaborating for a year when Chase saw them perform live at the Whiskey in Los Angeles and recommended that they pursue a side project. That year the band was signed Chase's label Re-Constriction Records and issued their debut studio album Big Shiny Spears. Underground, Inc. released their second album Ditch the Attitude, Pally which charted at one hundred thirty-five on CMJ Radio 200. In September 2013, the band released their third studio album Body Snatchers on Cracknation Records.

Discography
Studio albums
Big Shiny Spears (1997, Re-Constriction)
Ditch the Attitude, Pally (2002, Underground, Inc.)
Body Snatchers (2013, Cracknation)

References

External links 

Musical groups established in 1996
1996 establishments in Illinois
Musical groups from Chicago
American industrial music groups
Electro-industrial music groups
Cracknation Records artists
Re-Constriction Records artists
Underground, Inc. artists